Riorges is a commune in the Loire department in central France.

Population

Le Scarabée 
Opened in 2008, Le Scarabée is a building designed by architect Alain Sarfati. It has hosted a large number of events: trade shows, shows, concerts, conventions of companies, seminars, congresses, and general assemblies.

It has a maximum seated capacity of 5,500 for concerts. Le Scarabée was largely funded by Grand Roanne Agglomération who invested 23 million euros. The management and organisation were entrusted to the international company GL Events, led locally by Laurence Bussière.

The venue was inaugurated on December 8, 2008 with a concert by Charles Aznavour. In 2019, it was the start and finish of Stage 4 of the Criterium de Dauphine, an Individual Time Trial won by Wout Van Aert.

Since 2008, Le Scarabée has visited by more than a million visitors.

Twin towns - sister cities
Riorges is twinned with:
 Calasparra, Spain
 Donzdorf, Germany
 Elland, England, United Kingdom
 Piatra Neamț, Romania

See also 
 Communes of the Loire department

References

Communes of Loire (department)